RK Bitola (HC Bitola) was a team handball club from Bitola, North Macedonia. They competed in the Macedonian Handball Super League.

References

External links
Official Website
RFM Profile
Macedonian Handball Federation

Bitola
Sport in Bitola